Yerevan Azeri drama theater was named after Jafar Jabbarly is the Azerbaijan State Drama Theater, launched in Yerevan in 1928.

Historical overview 
In the early years (1880-1882) of the theater, performances were presented by amateur actors in Yerevan.  French traveller Jean Chardin also indicated his thoughts in his writings, when he visited Yerevan at the end of the seventh century. During his travel he watched the show presented by male actors and dancers there. In 1882, the plays of the Armenian author V. Madatov were also started to stage in the Azerbaijanian language. After the arrival of Firudin Kocharli to work as a teacher in Yerevan in 1885, drama theatre also encountered the successful performances. He was eager to participate in the city's cultural occasions and assembles a troupe which staged "Monsieur Jordan and the Dervish Mesteli Shah" base on the Akhundov's play in 1886. The play staged in Turkish language by the students of the Teacher's Seminary on 4 April 1886.

Since 1896, performances in the Azeri language have started to take place regularly in Yerevan. In the pre-revolutionary years, the amateurs were staged several well-known plays in the region such as The Inspector General Nikolai Gogol, "Haji Gara" M.F. Akhundov, "Nadir Shah" Nariman Narimanov, "Deads" Jalil Mammadguluzade. Early staged plays were: Dursunali and Ballibadi (1893), Girt-girt (Cluck) (1893), Haji Gara (1894), Reluctant Marriage (1899). These plays were staged in the small venues and were not covered by press.

Canpoladov Brother's theatre was also chosen as a place for staging the plays in Yerevan. On 8 December 1896 "Monsieur Jordan and Dervish Mastali Shah" was performed in that theatre. E. Ter-Grigoryan praised this play and performers, especially, the role of Shahrabanu in the writing of the newspaper Nor dar (New age) of 19 December 1896. The role of Shahrabanu was acted by Yunis Nuri who worked for fifty years in the Yerevan Drama Theatre as an actor, stage director and director of the theater. During the working years in the theatre he along with Mashadi Ismayil staged some plays such as, The Vizier of the Lenkeran Khan (1897), Avarice Creates Enemies (1899), My tongue is my enemy (1900), The Alchemist Molla Ibrahimkhalil (1901), Ignorance (with E.Sultanov, 1902), Haji Gara (with F. Abdulla, 1902). Moreover, his further plays were staged in the wider Canpoladov Brother's theatre between 1905 and 1909, including "The Government Inspector" by Gogol.

Further history 
The theater operated until 1988 (with a break in 1949 - 1967). The central place in the repertoire of the theater was covered by musical comedies "Arshin mal alan", Mashadi Ibad (If Not That One, Then This One) Uzeyir Hajibeyov. At different times, Yunis Nuri, Kazim Zia, Ali Shahsabakhly and others performed in the theater.

During the years of 1934 - 1951 the main director of the theater was Bakhshi Galandarly. "Othello" was staged by the Yerevan drama theater named after J. Jabbarly in the "All-Union Festival of Shakespearean Performances", dedicated to the 380th anniversary of the birth of William Shakespeare in April 1944.

After a long break for several years, the theater started to work in Yerevan again in 1967. The plays such as, "Sevil" by J. Jabbarly, "Namus" by A. Shirvanzade, "Farhad and Shirin" by S. Vurgun, "Flame" by A. Erevanly and A. Suleymanov were included in repertoire of theater.

Establishment of the theater 
In March 1928 Yerevan Turkish theater was established under the leadership of Yunis Nuri. The theater functioned in the Armenian SSR, remaining the only Azerbaijani theater in Armenia. In the 1930s, the theater was called the "Azerbaijan state theater named after  J. Jabbarly or the "Armenian State Turkish theater named after J. Jabbarly.

Current activity 
Since 1989 the troupe of the theater continued its activity in Baku, in the theatrical studio at the Azerbaijan Drama Theater. In 1994 the status of state was again given to the theater by the decree of the President of Azerbaijan Heydar Aliyev. Yerevan State Azerbaijan theater continues to stage plays in Azerbaijan and Georgia, Dagistan and Turkey. On 16 October 2007 the theater's anniversary was celebrated at the Azerbaijan State Musical Comedy theater in Baku by the presidential decree.

See also 
 Bakhshi Galandarli

References 

Theatre in Azerbaijan
1928 establishments in Azerbaijan